Faughalstown, is a civil parish in County Westmeath, Ireland.

Faughalstown is one of 8 civil parishes in the barony of Fore in the Province of Leinster.

Faughalstown civil parish comprises 20 townlands: Ballybeg, Derrynagarragh, Faughalstown, Froghanstown, Gartlandstown, Grangestown, Kiltoom, Milltown, Ranahinch, Ringstown, Streamstown and Templanstown.

The neighbouring civil parishes are: Mayne and Rathgarve to the north, Kilpatrick and St. Feighin's to the east and Taghmon to the south.

References

External links
Faughalstown civil parish at the IreAtlas Townland Data Base
Faughalstown civil parish at townlands.ie
Faughalstown civil parish at The Placename Database of Ireland

Civil parishes of County Westmeath